The 2017 IFAF Women's World Championship was the third IFAF Women's World Championship, an American football competition for women. It was held between June 24 and 30, 2017. The tournament was hosted at McLeod Stadium in Langley, British Columbia, Canada. The defending champion is United States.

Participating teams

Preliminary stage

Placement games

5th placed game

Bronze medal game

Championship game

See also
 Football Canada
 American football

References

External links
 Official website

IFAF Women's World Championship
Langley, British Columbia (city)
American football in Canada
World Championship
American footbal
2017 in Canadian sports
June 2017 sports events in Canada